The White Hill Wind Farm is a wind farm in New Zealand operated by Meridian Energy. It was officially opened in 2007.

It is located six kilometres south-east of Mossburn in the Southland Region of the South Island. The wind farm covers approximately 24 square kilometers of mainly forestry land.

See also

Wind power in New Zealand

References

External links
Meridian Energy - White Hill Wind Farm

Wind farms in New Zealand
Buildings and structures in Southland, New Zealand